The following is a list of awards won by Filipina singer Kyla.

Since her debut, Kyla has released a total of ten studio albums, eight of which were certified Platinum albums. Kyla is managed by Cornerstone Talent Management Center and is an ABS-CBN and Star Music artist.

2019

2018

2017

2016

2015

2014

2013

2012

2011

2010

2009

2008

2007

2006

2005

2004

2003

2002

2001

1997

1993

References 

Kyla